What's Rock and Roll is the second studio album by English indie band the Reytons, self-released on 20 January 2023

The album debuted atop the UK Albums Chart, marking a rare occasion of an unsigned band topping the album chart. Off the back of the success they signed a global music publishing deal.

Commercial performance 
The album debuted at number 1 in the UK Albums Chart on 27 January 2023. The album sold 12,252 copies to debut at the top and was released in 32 different formats including 16 different CD versions, five different cassettes and a deluxe podcast edition. Alan Jones of Music Week commented that this number of formats might be the most for any number-one album in chart history.

Track listing

Charts

Tour dates

References

2023 albums
Self-released albums
The Reytons albums